Plaza Rio Hondo is a shopping mall in Bayamón, Puerto Rico. It opened in 1982 and is anchored by Marshalls Megastore, Caribbean Cinemas, TJ Maxx, and Best Buy, with one vacant anchor spot last occupied by a Kmart.

History

The shopping centers original anchors included Woolworth, which shuttered in 1997 and was split between Marshalls and Tiendas Capri.

In April of 1998 Management (Yebba Realty Ventures) believed that Plaza Rio Hondo required additional food services within the mall. Shortly after the acquisition a long-time tenant, with considerable lease term remaining and occupying 20,000 sq ft at the center of the mall, began to experience financial difficulties. Management immediately entered into negotiations to purchase the lease, which they were able to do for $600,000. A 12-unit food court plus 2 outside facing retail bays were complete at a total cost of approximately $3,645,000. The first year net income generated from the food court was approximately $ 1,112,280. The total cost of the lease buy-out and food court construction was approximately $4,245,000 thereby equating to a yield on investment of 26.2%. Again applying a 10% cap rate to the net operating income stream, Management created additional net value of $6,877,800. Beyond that, the food court increased the business at the mall.

In 2001 Yebba Realty Ventures sold the mall to Caribbean Property Group (CPG) for a purchase price of $16,683,080 million dollars.

In 2004, Marshalls moved from its existing store at the mall to a Megastore at the other end. The original Marshalls became a flagship store for CompUSA, which closed in 2008 and became Best Buy.   

In 2005 the mall was acquired by DDR Corp. from a $1.15 billion dollar portfolio deal with Caribbean Property Group (CPG) which included the mall.

TJ Maxx replaced Tiendas Capri former space in 2011.

Ownership partnered with textiles retailer Anna's Linens to open stores at Rio Hondo and other malls in Puerto Rico in 2012.

In 2014, DDR Corp. announced a full remodel of the mall.

In 2017 DDR Corp. spun off its Puerto Rican shopping centers to RVI (Retail Value Inc.) due to struggles they had after the Hurricane Maria, making Retail Value Inc. the new owner of the mall at the time.

On November 6, 2019, it was announced that Kmart would be closing in February 2020.

In August 2021 Developers Diversified (DDR Corp.) came back to the PR retail landscape with a $550 million dollar deal with RVI which Plaza Rio Hondo was included in, making DDR the owner of the mall once again.

References

Shopping malls in Puerto Rico
Buildings and structures in Bayamón, Puerto Rico
Shopping malls established in 1982